Dareshgeft or Dareshgaft or Dar Eshgaft or Darashgoft may refer to:
Dar Eshgaft, Ilam
Dareshgaft, Khuzestan
Dareshgeft, Aligudarz, Lorestan Province
Dareshgaft, Khorramabad, Lorestan Province
Dareshgeft, Papi, Lorestan Province
Dar Eshgaft-e Baba Bahram, Lorestan Province

See also
Darreh Eshgoft (disambiguation)